1965 in the Philippines details events of note that happened in the Philippines in 1965.

Incumbents

 President:
Diosdado Macapagal (Liberal) (until December 30)
Ferdinand Marcos (Nacionalista Party) (starting December 30)
 Vice President:
Emmanuel Pelaez (Liberal) (until December 30)
Fernando Lopez (Nacionalista Party) (starting December 30)
 Chief Justice: César Bengzon 
 Congress: 5th (until December 17)

Events

June
 June 19 – The provinces of Eastern Samar, Northern Samar and Western Samar are created after approval of Republic Act 4221.

September
 September 28 – Taal Volcano erupts killing hundreds.

November
 November 9 – Ferdinand Marcos is elected president during the presidential elections.

December
 December 30 – Ferdinand Marcos takes his oath of office.

Holidays

As per Act No. 2711 section 29, issued on March 10, 1917, any legal holiday of fixed date falls on Sunday, the next succeeding day shall be observed as legal holiday. Sundays are also considered legal religious holidays. Bonifacio Day was added through Philippine Legislature Act No. 2946. It was signed by then-Governor General Francis Burton Harrison in 1921. On October 28, 1931, the Act No. 3827 was approved declaring the last Sunday of August as National Heroes Day. As per Republic Act No. 3022, April 9th is proclaimed as Bataan Day. Independence Day was changed from July 4 (Philippine Republic Day) to June 12 (Philippine Independence Day) on August 4, 1964.

 January 1 – New Year's Day
 February 22 – Legal Holiday
 April 9 – Bataan Day
 April 15 – Maundy Thursday
 April 16 – Good Friday
 May 1 – Labor Day
 June 12 – Independence Day
 July 4 – Philippine Republic Day
 August 13  – Legal Holiday
 August 29  – National Heroes Day
 November 22 – Thanksgiving Day
 November 30 – Bonifacio Day
 December 25 – Christmas Day
 December 30 – Rizal Day

Births
February 20 – Nilo Divina, lawyer 
February 22 – Wilfredo Alicdan, artist
February 25 – Maricel Soriano, actress
May 6 –  Honey Lacuna, politician
May 11 – Monsour del Rosario, Olympic athlete and actor
June 10 – Joey Santiago, guitarist and composer.
June 21 – Marlon Maro, football player and coach
November 2:
 Arnold Clavio, journalist and radio anchor
 Susan Yap, politician
November 10 – Arthur C. Yap, politician.
December 27 – Luchi Cruz-Valdes, broadcast journalist

Deaths
 February 9 – Joaquín Miguel Elizalde, Filipino diplomat and businessman (b.1896)
 March 22 – Daniel Z. Romualdez, Filipino politician (b. 1907)
 May 14 – Francisco Alonso Liongson, Filipino writer and lawyer (b. 1896)
 May 16 – Pablo Angeles y David, Filipino magistrate and statesman. (b. 1889)
 September 20 – Cipriano Primicias, Sr., Filipino politician (b. 1901)

References